Jiangfang Township is a rural township in Chengbu Miao Autonomous County, Hunan, China. It borders Maoping Town in the north, Rulin Town in the east and south, and Guanxia Miao Ethnic Township of Suining County in the west.

Name
The name of the township is named after a pulp and paper workshop in the Song dynasty (960–1279) named "Jiangjiafang". In the local dialect, the pronunciation of the characters "" and "" are similar, therefore, it is called "Jiangfang".

Administrative division
As of 2015, the township is divided into 7 villages: Liulin, Jianping, Shanfang, Putou, Datong, Zhulian and Taihe.

Geography
The township is located in the north of Chengbu Miao Autonomous County.

The Meixi River winds through the township.

Demographics
In December 2015, the township had an estimated population of 11,100 and a population density of 116 persons per km2. Miao people is the dominant ethnic group in the township, accounting for 7,680, accounting for 69.19%. There are also 4 ethnic groups, including Dong, Hui, Han, and Manchu. Among them, there are 2,763 Han people (24.89%),  305 Dong (2.75%), 263 Hui (2.37%), and 89 Manchu people (0.80%).

Economy
The principal industries in the area are agriculture, forestry and mineral resources.

Transport
The township is connected to two highways: Provincial Highway S219, which heads south to downtown Chengbu Miao Autonomous County and north to Wugang via the towns of Maoping and Xiyan, and Provincial Highway S319, which heads north to Guanxia Miao Ethnic Township of Suining County.

References

Chengbu Miao Autonomous County